Fazekas Mihály Gimnázium may refer to:

 Fazekas Mihály Gimnázium (Budapest)
 Fazekas Mihály Gimnázium (Debrecen)